Edward Barry (October 2, 1882 – June 19, 1920) was a left-handed starting pitcher in Major League Baseball who played from 1905 to 1907 with the Boston Americans. His nickname was "Jumbo".

Further reading

External links

Ed Barry at Baseball Almanac

Major League Baseball pitchers
Boston Americans players
Decatur Commodores players
Houghton Giants players
Providence Grays (minor league) players
Baseball players from Wisconsin
Sportspeople from Madison, Wisconsin
1882 births
1920 deaths